Charles Delac (1885–1965) was a French Algerian film producer.

Selected filmography
 The Secret of Polichinelle (1923)
 Graziella (1926)
 The Man with the Hispano (1926)
 The Marriage of Mademoiselle Beulemans (1927)
 The Maelstrom of Paris (1928)
 Mountains on Fire (1931)
 Moon Over Morocco (1931)
 Le Bal (1931)
 Madame Makes Her Exit (1932)
 Amourous Adventure (1932)
 The Five Accursed Gentlemen (1932)
 A Man's Neck (1933)
 The Man with the Hispano (1933)
 The Lady of Lebanon (1934)
 Love and Desire (1951)

References

Bibliography
 McCann, Ben. Julien Duvivier. Oxford University Press, 2017.

External links

1885 births
1965 deaths
French film producers
Algerian film producers
People from Mascara, Algeria
Pieds-Noirs
Migrants from French Algeria to France